Mohammad-Reza Khatami (born 1959) is an Iranian politician and nephrologist.

Early life and education
Khatami was born in Ardakan, Iran, in 1959. He is younger brother of former president Mohammad Khatami. Khatami is educated in medicine and before entering politics, he was a practicing nephrologist (kidney specialist) for a number of years. He is a faculty member of Tehran University of Medical sciences.

Career
Khatami was the first Secretary-General of the Islamic Iran Participation Front,  the largest Iranian reformist party. He is now a member of the central council of the party. He is also the former deputy speaker of the Iranian parliament. He entered politics in 1997 after his brother's victory and was appointed deputy minister of health.

He was elected in March 2000 for the sixth term of the Islamic Republic's parliament's election as the first representative of Tehran with 1,794,365 votes from the people of Tehran. He has also acted as the manager in charge of the now-banned reformist daily Mosharekat.  Sometimes described as  "ultraliberal" in his views, he was "disqualified from running for any office by the Guardian Council."

Personal life
In 1983, Khatami married Zahra Eshraghi, granddaughter of Ruhollah Khomeini (founder of the Islamic republic), and an activist in women's rights. They have two children — a daughter, Fatemeh, who at the moment studying at a university in London, and a son, Ali.

On 28 March 2020, Khatami announced he tests positive for COVID-19 with publishing a video showing he is at hospital.

References

1959 births
Living people
Iranian reformists
First Deputies of Islamic Consultative Assembly
Second Deputies of Islamic Consultative Assembly
Iranian urologists
Iranian nephrologists
Iranian democracy activists
People from Ardakan
Islamic Iran Participation Front politicians
Members of the 6th Islamic Consultative Assembly
Muslim Student Followers of the Imam's Line
Secretaries-General of political parties in Iran
Islamic Association of University Instructors politicians
Mohammad Khatami